José María de Caralt (born 19 May 1907, date of death unknown) was a Spanish field hockey player. He competed in the men's tournament at the 1928 Summer Olympics.

References

External links
 

1907 births
Year of death missing
Spanish male field hockey players
Olympic field hockey players of Spain
Field hockey players at the 1928 Summer Olympics
Place of birth missing